Papendrecht is a town and municipality in the western Netherlands, in the province of South Holland, at the crossing of the River Beneden Merwede and the Noord River.

Although Papendrecht is first mentioned in documents dating back to 1105, it remained a small settlement until the 1950s. In the 1960s its development accelerated and almost its entire area is now urbanized. It is, however, known for its 180-year-old linden tree by the river.

Economy
The largest company headquartered in Papendrecht is Royal Boskalis Westminster.

The aerospace company Fokker Technologies is also headquartered in Papendrecht.

Transportation 
Papendrecht has three water taxi stops, one at the Beneden Merwede River, one at the Noord River, and one near Kooihaven. Bus services are provided by Arriva. Bus service Qliner ( part of Arriva ) has got a stop in Papendrecht for its bus service from Dordrecht to Utrecht and back.

Notable people 
 Anton Willem Nieuwenhuis (1864–1953) a Dutch explorer and physician, studied the Dayak people
 Carel Visser (1928-2015) a Dutch abstract-minimalist, constructivist sculptor
 Jan Klijnjan (born 1945) a Dutch former international footballer with over 300 club caps 
 Ronald Bandell (1946–2015) a Dutch civil servant and politician, Mayor of Papendrecht 1987-1995 
 Yolanda Hadid (born 1964) a Dutch-American TV personality and former model
 Guido van der Werve (born 1977) a Dutch filmmaker and visual artist
 Liza van der Most (born 1993) a Dutch footballer, who has played 137 games for AFC Ajax women 
 Julia Bergshoeff (born 1997) a Dutch fashion model
 Naomi Visser (born 2001) a Dutch gymnast

Gallery

References

External links 

Official Website
Culturele Raad Papendrecht, the Local Arts Council

 
Municipalities of South Holland
Populated places in South Holland
Alblasserwaard
Drechtsteden